Ahmed Al-Kaebi (born 1 December 1987) is a Saudi football player who played in the Pro League for Al-Shabab, Al-Raed and Al-Shoulla.

References
http://www.slstat.com/spl2013-2014en/player.php?id=64

1987 births
Living people
Saudi Arabian footballers
Al-Raed FC players
Al-Shabab FC (Riyadh) players
Al-Riyadh SC players
Al-Shoulla FC players
Al-Hazem F.C. players
Al-Qadsiah FC players
Al-Kawkab FC players
Saudi First Division League players
Saudi Professional League players
Saudi Second Division players
Association football midfielders